The 1959–60 season, was the second season of the Turkish First Football League. Beşiktaş finished first place, winning their first League title. Beşiktaş also qualified for the UEFA Champions League for the third time.

Season

Turkish First Football League

UEFA Ranking
Club Ranking for 1960 (UEFA Club Coefficients in parentheses)
 53  København XI (0.500)
 53  Sporting (0.500)
 53  Beşiktaş J.K. (0.500)
 53  Gwardia Warsaw (0.500)
 53  Honvéd Budapest (0.500)

Source: Full List

External links
http://www.angelfire.com/nj/sivritepe/5960/tl.html

Beşiktaş J.K. seasons
Besiktas
Turkish football championship-winning seasons